Gaël Monfils was the last champion at the 2010 edition.
Tomáš Berdych won the final 6–2, 4–6, 6–3 against Gaël Monfils.

Seeds
The top four seeds received a bye into the second round.

Draw

Finals

Top half

Bottom half

Qualifying

Seeds

Qualifiers

Qualifying draw

First qualifier

Second qualifier

Third qualifier

Fourth qualifier

References 
General

Specific

Singles